East Side Kids is a 1940 film and the first in the East Side Kids film series.  It is the only one not to star any of the original six Dead End Kids.  The film was released by producer Sam Katzman. This was also his first project at Monogram Pictures, which he joined shortly after the folding of his company Victory Pictures.

Plot
Police officer Pat O'Day, a former child of the tenements, tries to reform a gang of street kids by involving them in a boys' police club. When club member Danny Dolan's brother Knuckles is sentenced to death row for killing a treasury agent, Pat vows to help Danny clear his brother, whom he believes is innocent, but before he can begin his investigation, the police commissioner demotes him to walking a beat. Meanwhile, a counterfeiting ring composed of Mileaway Harris, a former tenement kid, Morris, and his girl friend May sets up shop in shopkeeper's Schmidt's, basement. Feeling threatened by Pat, Morris schemes to discredit the policeman by posing as a businessman who wants to hire Pat's boys to distribute advertising leaflets. Unknown to Pat, Morris places bogus five dollar bills in the pay envelopes, and when the boys are caught passing fake money, Pat is implicated in the counterfeiting scheme. To prove his innocence, Pat takes to the streets, and Danny, still unaware of Morris' involvement in the counterfeiting ring, agrees to deliver a suitcase for him to May. A policeman follows Danny to May's apartment, where they are greeted by Mileaway, who kills the policeman and takes Danny hostage. As they drive across town, Danny learns that it was Mileaway who killed the treasury agent and framed Knuckles. Pat tracks down Mileaway's car, and in the ensuing chase, Mileaway escapes and kills Schmidt. Pat and the kids chase Mileaway to a rooftop, where Dutch, Danny's friend, struggles with Mileaway. When they both fall to the sidewalk, Dutch is killed; but Mileaway lives to confess to the agent's murder, and all ends happily as both Knuckles and Pat are exonerated.

Cast

The East Side Kids
Hal E. Chester as Fred "Dutch" Kuhn
Harris Berger as Danny Dolan
Frankie Burke as Skinny
Jack Edwards as Algernon 'Mouse' Wilkes
Donald Haines as Peewee
Eddie Brian as Mike
Sam Edwards as Pete

Remaining Cast
Leon Ames as Pat O'Day
Dennis Moore as Milton 'Mileway' Harris
Joyce Bryant as Molly Dolan
Vince Barnett as Whisper
Dave O'Brien as 'Knuckles' Dolan
Ted Adams as Schmidt
Maxine Leslie as May
Robert Fiske as Cornwall
Jim Farley as Police Captain Moran
Alden 'Stephen' Chase as Detective Joe
Fred Hoose as Mr. Wilkes
Eric Burtis as Eric
Frank Yaconelli as Tony the grocer

Crew
Directed by: Robert F. Hill
Screenplay by: William Lively
Produced by: Sam Katzman
Music composed by: Johnny Lange, Lew Porter
Film editing by: Earl Turner
Cinematography by: Arthur Reed
Production Management: Ed W. Rote
Assistant Director: Glenn Cook
Sound: Glen Glenn

Home media
The film was originally released on DVD by Alpha Video on June 24, 2003 and has since been re-released multiple times by a variety of manufacturers.

References

External links
 
 

1940 films
1940s English-language films
Films directed by Robert F. Hill
Monogram Pictures films
1940 comedy films
Films produced by Sam Katzman
American comedy films
American black-and-white films
East Side Kids
1940s American films